Vladimir Markelov (born 24 October 1957) is a Russian former gymnast who competed in the 1976 Summer Olympics and in the 1980 Summer Olympics.
He was also part of the gold medal winning soviet team at the 1979 World championships and the silver medal winning team in 1974. Individually his best result was a bronze medal on the parallel bars at the 1974 World championships.

References

1957 births
Living people
Russian male artistic gymnasts
Soviet male artistic gymnasts
Olympic gymnasts of the Soviet Union
Gymnasts at the 1976 Summer Olympics
Gymnasts at the 1980 Summer Olympics
Olympic gold medalists for the Soviet Union
Olympic silver medalists for the Soviet Union
Olympic medalists in gymnastics
Medalists at the 1980 Summer Olympics
Medalists at the 1976 Summer Olympics
Universiade medalists in gymnastics
Universiade silver medalists for the Soviet Union
Medalists at the 1977 Summer Universiade
European champions in gymnastics